The Virginia Aquarium & Marine Science Center, formerly known as the Virginia Marine Science Museum, is an aquarium and marine science museum located in Virginia Beach, Virginia, just south of Rudee Inlet.

History

The aquarium opened on June 14, 1986, as the Virginia Marine Science Museum. The focus of exhibits was on life in the rivers of Virginia, Chesapeake Bay, and the marine waters just off of Virginia.  In 1995, the aquarium expanded, tripling its size. On November 21, 2009, the Virginia Aquarium opened a  series of exhibits called Restless Planet. The $25 million renovation designed by Chermayeff & Poole of Boston includes for habitats: Malaysian Peat Swamp, Coastal Sahara Desert, Red Sea, and Indonesia's Flores Island and doubled the number of species displayed by the aquarium.  Some of the new animals include Komodo dragons, tomistomas, spotted eagle rays, and cuttlefish.

Exhibits

The two main exhibit buildings of the aquarium are the Bay and Main Building and South Building (opening soon.  The two are connected by a one-third mile outdoor nature trail running alongside Owls Creek Salt Marsh. Together the two buildings are home to more than 12,000 animals representing over 700 species.

Main Building

The Main Building houses displays intended to show the journey of water from the rivers of Virginia, through the Chesapeake Bay, and out into the ocean. The Restless Planet part of the displays are intended to show the forces that shaped Virginia.

Chesapeake Bay Aquarium

The Chesapeake Bay Aquarium starts with a touch pool where visitors can touch horseshoe crabs, Forbes' sea stars, and whelk. The rest of the exhibit showcases species that live in the shallow waters around the Chesapeake Bay Bridge-Tunnel including hermit crabs, spider crabs, and Hypsoblennius hentz.

Norfolk Canyon Aquarium

The Norfolk Canyon aquarium replicates the underwater environment of the Norfolk Canyon, a canyon roughly 70 miles off the coast of Virginia. This exhibit is home to sandbar shark, nurse shark and sand tiger shark as well as fish such as crevalle jack, grey triggerfish and southern stingray.

Chesapeake Light Tower Aquarium

Restless Planet

The new Restless Planet expansion includes five immersive displays (a Malaysian peat swamp, the coastal desert, a replica of the Mediterranean Sea, the  Red Sea exhibit and a recreation of an Indonesian volcanic island), and new hands-on exhibits intended to show the forces that shaped the Virginia landscape into what it is today. Some of the animals in these exhibits include Komodo dragons, tomistomas, spotted eagle rays, zebra shark, Egyptian cobra, hedgehog and cuttlefish.

South Building - Opens Soon

The South Building opening soon and will feature North American river otters, a red octopus, moon jellies, and other animals. This new building will give guests behind-the-scenes access to the Vet Center, Stranding Response Program, and Water Quality Lab. The new building will also include a large outdoor play area for kids, with water tables, climbing nets, bubbles, and more.  The Research and Conservation branch of the aquarium is responsible for the Stranding Response Program, which responds to sick or injured seals, dolphins, whales, and sea turtles from local shores. The Marsh Pavilion will be closing to the public for renovations on January 2, 2019.

Aviary

The Virginia Aquarium Aviary was a half-acre habitat located behind the March Pavilion, and was home to 70 birds of about 30 species including a great horned owl, turkey vultures, great blue herons, brown pelicans, fulvous whistling duck, great egrets, and ruddy ducks. Many of the birds had been injured and rehabilitated, and could not be released back into the wild.  The aviary was badly damaged by a storm in the winter of 2015; though no birds were killed, most had to be dispersed to other wildlife centers. At the moment there is a crow and osprey on exhibit, with others off exhibit but used for educational programs. There are no current plans to rebuild the aviary.

Notes

External links

 Official Virginia Aquarium website
 Virginia Aquarium Sensible Seafood Program Article

Aquaria in Virginia
Museums in Virginia Beach, Virginia
Natural history museums in Virginia
1986 establishments in Virginia